Thomas Milner Gibson PC (3 September 1806 – 25 February 1884) was a British politician.

Background and education
Thomas Milner Gibson came of a Suffolk family, but was born in Port of Spain, Trinidad, where his father, Thomas Milner Gibson, was serving as an officer in the British Army. 

He was educated in Trinidad, in a school at Higham Hill also attended by Benjamin Disraeli, at Charterhouse, and at Trinity College, Cambridge, where he graduated in 1830.

Political career
In 1837, Gibson was elected to parliament as Conservative member for Ipswich, but resigned two years later and losing the subsequent by-election, having adopted Liberal views, and became an ardent supporter of the free-trade movement. As one of Richard Cobden's chief allies, he was elected to the House of Commons as Member of Parliament for Manchester in 1841, and, from 1846 to 1848, he was Vice-President of the Board of Trade in Lord John Russell's ministry. 

Although defeated in Manchester in 1857, he found another seat for Ashton-under-Lyne, and sat in the cabinet under Lord Palmerston and then Russell from 1859 to 1866 as President of the Board of Trade. 

In 1846, he was sworn of the Privy Council.
Gibson was the leading spirit in the movement for the repeal of taxes on knowledge, and his successful efforts on behalf of journalism and advertising were recognized by a public testimonial in 1862. He retired from political life in 1868, but he and his wife, whose salon was a great Liberal centre, were for many years very influential in society.

Family

Milner Gibson married Arethusa Susannah Cullum, daughter of Revd. Sir Thomas Gery Cullum, 7th Baronet of Hardwick House, Suffolk, in 1832. They resided at Theberton House, Suffolk.

Gibson also had a relationship with Susannah Bowles, a servant girl. Their son, Thomas Gibson Bowles, became a noted publisher and was the maternal grandfather of the Mitford sisters.

Milner Gibson died on board his yacht, the Resolute, at Algiers on 25 February 1884, aged 77, and was buried in St. Peter's churchyard at Theberton in Suffolk on 13 March.

Notes

References

Thomas Milner Gibson and wife Susannah, The Gentleman's Magazine, 1855

External links 
 

1806 births
1884 deaths
People from Port of Spain
British male sailors (sport)
People educated at Charterhouse School
Alumni of Trinity College, Cambridge
Conservative Party (UK) MPs for English constituencies
Liberal Party (UK) MPs for English constituencies
Whig (British political party) MPs for English constituencies
UK MPs 1837–1841
UK MPs 1841–1847
UK MPs 1847–1852
UK MPs 1852–1857
UK MPs 1857–1859
UK MPs 1859–1865
Members of the Privy Council of the United Kingdom
Members of the Parliament of the United Kingdom for Ipswich
UK MPs 1865–1868
Presidents of the Board of Trade
Members of the Parliament of the United Kingdom for Ashton-under-Lyne
Members of the Parliament of the United Kingdom for Manchester